Stânișoara River may refer to the following rivers in Romania:

 Stânișoara River (Sunători)
 Stânișoara, a tributary of the Sibișel in Hunedoara County
 Stânișoara River (Cârlibaba)

See also 
 Stâna River (disambiguation)